The 2015 WNBL Finals was the postseason tournament of the WNBL's 2014–15 season. The Bendigo Spirit were the two-time defending champions, however they were defeated in the Grand Final by the Townsville Fire. The 2014–15 WNBL Championship was Townsville's first title.

Standings

Bracket
<onlyinclude>

Semi-finals

(1) Townsville Fire vs. (2) Bendigo Spirit

(3) Dandenong Rangers vs. (4) Sydney Uni Flames

Preliminary final

(2) Bendigo Spirit vs. (4) Sydney Uni Flames

Grand Final

(1) Townsville Fire vs. (2) Bendigo Spirit

Rosters

References 

Women's National Basketball League Finals
Finals